Ionuț Constantin Panțîru (born 22 March 1996) is a Romanian professional footballer who plays for Liga I club FCSB as a left back or a left winger.

Club career

Politehnica Iași

In January 2017, after a year in the Romanian third league with Știința Miroslava, Panțîru moved to Liga I club Politehnica Iași. He subsequently signed a five-year deal with his new team.

On 17 November 2017, Panțîru scored his first goal for Politehnica, in a Liga I game against FCSB, and helped his team earn a 1–0 victory.

FCSB 
In April 2021, Panțiru was seriously injured after colliding with a teammate on the field. Two operations in Italy followed and 11 months off. The recovery did not go well, so he underwent a third surgery and was subsequently sidelined for another 8 months.

Activity in the past 
In the past, Pantîru would have made video chats for men, but everything would have been to help his sick mother. The new defender of the red-blues spoke, at the first press conference held at FCSB, about this aspect of his life.

Career statistics

Club

Honours

FCSB
Cupa României : 2019–20
Supercupa României runner-up: 2020

References

External links
 
 

1996 births
Living people
Sportspeople from Iași
Romanian footballers
Association football defenders
Association football midfielders
Liga I players
Liga II players
CS Știința Miroslava players
FC Politehnica Iași (2010) players
FC Steaua București players